Early general elections were held in Libya to elect the House of Representatives on 8 May 1965, following the dissolution of parliament by King Idris after the 1964 elections. As political parties were banned, all candidates ran as independents. In order to ensure the victory of pro-government candidates, ballot boxes were tampered with by police.

References

Libya
Elections in Libya
1965 in Libya
Non-partisan elections
May 1965 events in Africa